Păulian or Paulian may refer to several villages in Romania:

 Păulian, a village in Buteni Commune, Arad County
 Paulian, a village in Doba Commune, Satu Mare County